Daniel Friedrich Hecht (8 July 1777 – 13 March 1833) was a German mathematician born in Sosa. He was a mine manager, then a teacher and finally a professor of mathematics. He is most notable for writing high school textbooks on math and geometry. He died in Saxony.

References

Further reading
M Koch, Biography in Dictionary of Scientific Biography (New York 1970–1990).
C Schiffner, Daniel Friedrich Hecht, Aus dem Leben alter Freiberger Bergstudenten I (Freiberg, 1935), 244–245.

1777 births
1833 deaths
People from Eibenstock
People from the Electorate of Saxony
German Lutherans
19th-century German mathematicians